Barwa may refer to :

Places 
 in India
 Barwa, Narkatiaganj (census code 216634), a village in West Champaran district of Bihar, India
 Barwa, Narkatiaganj (census code 216656), a village in West Champaran district of Bihar, India

 Barwa Barauli, a village in West Champaran district of Bihar, India
 Barwa, Rajasthan
 Barwa, Nawanshahr, a village in Shaheed Bhagat Singh Nagar district of Punjab State, India.
 Elsewhere
 a town in present Pakistan, formerly capital of Jandol State, a princely Frontier State in British India's Northwest Frontier Province

Other uses 
 Barwa (raga)

See also 
 Barwar (disambiguation)
 Beerwah (disambiguation)